Mary Dickinson may refer to:
Mary Lowe Dickinson (1839–1914), American writer and activist
Mary Norris Dickinson (1740–1803), American land and estate owner and manager

See also
Mary Dickerson (disambiguation)